The SKG Alliance (registered as LSDSP/KDS/GKL) was an association of political parties established on March 28, 2018, which consisted of the Latvian Social Democratic Workers' Party,  and the Christian Democratic Union. It was reorganized in 2019.

History 
The highest decision-making body of the association was the Assembly of Representatives, which could decide on amendments to the statutes, cooperation with other political institutions and associations, as well as decide on other issues. One representative from each of the founding parties of the association - Jānis Dinevičs, Andrejs Požarnovs and Mareks Raups - was appointed as members of the Assembly of Representatives.
The association participated in the 2018 Saeima elections, gaining only 0.21% of the vote and not overcoming the 5% barrier. On March 13, 2019, after the party From the Heart of Latvia (NSL) joined it, SKG changed its name to "Awakening".

The inclusion of the LSDSP in the potential association "Atmoda LSDSP" was approved in the party's congress, but some of its members refused to accept it. In April 2019, the party leader Jānis Dinevičs informed the media that the LSDSP had not joined the association due to disagreements with its partners over the name of the association. In the next elections, the LSDSP ran separately. 

On November 28, 2019, NSL merged with Honor to Serve Our Latvia, forming the party "Awakening For Latvia".

"Awakening" alliance members 

 Awakening For Latvia
 Christian Democratic Union

Election results

Legislative elections

References

External links 

 Official website
 Official LSDSP website
 Official KDS website
 Official GKL website

Political parties in Latvia